The Enchanted Cottage is a romance by the English playwright Arthur Wing Pinero, written in 1921. The play opened on Broadway at the Ritz Theatre on March 31, 1923, directed by Jessie Bonstelle and William A. Brady, and starring Herbert Bunston and Katharine Cornell and ran for 65 performances until May 1923.

In April 1925, The Enchanted Cottage was the opening play for the Omaha Community Playhouse, starring Dodie Brando, mother of Marlon Brando.

The play was published by Heinemann in 1922.

The Enchanted Cottage has been adapted for the screen in 1924, 1945 and 2016.

Notes

Plays by Arthur Wing Pinero
British plays adapted into films
1921 plays
Heinemann (publisher) books
West End plays